Tanneberger may refer to:

 André Tanneberger (born 1973), birth name of "ATB", German DJ, musician, and producer
 Marcus Tanneberger (born 1987), German violinist
 Stephan Tanneberger (1935–2018), German oncologist and chemist

See also 
 Tannenberg (disambiguation)
 Danneberg
 Dannenberg (disambiguation)

German-language surnames